Yunost is a rural locality (a village) in Michurinsky Selsoviet, Sharansky District, Bashkortostan, Russia. The population was 106 as of 2010. There are 2 streets.

Geography 
Yunost is located 26 km northeast of Sharan (the district's administrative centre) by road. Yelanchikbash is the nearest rural locality.

References 

Rural localities in Sharansky District